Komoro may refer to:

 Komoro Bridge, a suspension bridge in Madagascar 
 Komoro, Nagano, Japan
 Komoro Domain
 Kömörő, Szabolcs-Szatmár-Bereg county, Hungary
 Komoró, Szabolcs-Szatmár-Bereg county, Hungary

See also

 Comoro (disambiguation)